Acacia lunata, commonly known as lunate-leaved acacia, is a shrub of the genus Acacia and the subgenus Phyllodineae that is endemic to eastern Australia.

Description
The racemose inflorescences occur prolifically in the upper axils. The spherical flower-heads have a diameter of  containing three to five loosely packed bright golden flowers.

Taxonomy
The species was first formally described by the botanist Conrad Loddiges in 1819 as a part of the work The Botanical Cabinet. It was reclassified as Racosperma lunatum by Leslie Pedley in 2003 then transferred back to genus Acacia in 2006.

Distribution
It is native to an area of New South Wales from around Cessnock in the north down to around Richmond in the south on slopes and around creeks in sandy sandstone based soils as a part of open Eucalyptus woodland communities.

See also
 List of Acacia species

References

lunata
Flora of New South Wales
Plants described in 1819